San Agustín is a village located in the Potosí Department of Bolivia. It is the capital of the San Agustín Canton, San Agustín Municipality and Enrique Baldivieso Province.

References 

Populated places in Potosí Department